Caspersen may refer to:

Andrew Caspersen, American financier
Erlend Caspersen (born 1982), Norwegian bassist
Finn M. W. Caspersen (1941–2009), American financier and philanthropist
Gunnar Caspersen (1932–2000), Norwegian trade unionist
Sven Caspersen (born 1935), Danish economist, former rector at Aalborg University
Maiken Caspersen Falla (born 1990), Norwegian cross-country skier

See also
Hans Caspersen House (disambiguation)
Caspersen School
Casparsson
Casper (disambiguation)
Kasper Sonne